Élisabeth of Lorraine (Élisabeth Thérèse; 5 April 1664 – 7 March 1748) was a French noblewoman and the Princess of Epinoy by marriage. She is often styled as the princesse de Lillebonne. She was the mother of Louis de Melun, Duke of Joyeuse who disappeared under mysterious circumstances in 1724 and of Anne Julie de Melun, princesse de Soubise.

Early life and ancestry 
A member of a cadet branch of the House of Guise, her father François Marie of Lorraine, Prince of Lillebonne was the youngest son of Charles II de Lorraine, Duke of Elbeuf and Catherine Henriette de Bourbon, a natural daughter of Henry IV of France and Gabrielle d'Estrées. Her mother, Anne of Lorraine (1639-1720), was her father's distant cousin and was the only daughter of Charles IV of Lorraine and his secret wife Béatrice de Cusance. The fifth of her parents' nine children, she was the only one of her siblings to marry or have children. She was styled Mademoiselle de Commercy at the French royal court, the princedom of Commercy being a subsidiary domain of the House of Lorraine.

Biography 
She was a lady in waiting to Marie Anne de Bourbon, Princess of Conti (1666–1739), a legitimised daughter of Louis XIV of France. 

She and her sister were said, by Saint-Simon, to be spies for Madame de Maintenon. While in the circle of the Grand Dauphin, she became close to his other half sister Louise Françoise de Bourbon known as Madame la Duchesse. She was also close to her uncle Charles Henri, Prince of Vaudémont and to Louis Joseph, Duke of Vendôme.

In 1721, at the death of her great-aunt, Marguerite Louise d'Orléans, Grand Duchess of Tuscany, Élisabeth Thérèse was designated her heiress, despite Marguerite Louise having allegedly promised that she would make her children her heirs.

She lost both her children in 1724: Louis, having secretly married Marie Anne de Bourbon (1697–1741), disappeared while at a ball at the Château de Chantilly in July. Anne Julie had died earlier from smallpox, leaving five young children.

She and her husband died on 7 March 1748 at the Hôtel de Mayenne. She was aged eighty-three.

Through her daughter, she is an ancestor of the present Duke of Montbazon of the House of Rohan.

Title 
Élisabeth Thérèse was the Duchess of Luxembourg-Saint-Pôl  in her own right. She bought the duchy from Marie d'Orléans in 1705, and in 1724 she transferred it to her son, who died shortly after. It was later given to her daughter who passed it to her son Charles de Rohan.

Marriage and issue 
On 7 October 1691, Mademoiselle de Commercy married Louis de Melun, Prince of Epinoy and Duke of Joyeuse, who was nine years younger than his bride). The couple had two children, one son born in 1694 and a daughter born in 1698. Only the latter would have issue.

 Louis de Melun, Duke of Joyeuse (October 1694 – 31 July 1724) married first to Armande de La Tour d'Auvergne, no issue; married secondly to Marie Anne de Bourbon (1697–1741), no issue;
 Anne Julie de Melun (1698 – 18 May 1724) married Jules de Rohan, Prince of Soubise and had issue; was grandmother of Charlotte de Rohan, wife of Louis Joseph, Prince of Condé.

Ancestry

References and notes

Elisabeth Therese
Elisabeth Therese
Elisabeth Therese
French ladies-in-waiting
17th-century French women
18th-century French women
1664 births
1748 deaths
Elisabeth Therese
French duchesses
St Pol, Countess of, Elisabeth Therese
Elisabeth Therese
Elisabeth Therese
Counts of Saint-Pol